Greatest Hits (& Some That Will Be) is a compilation album by country artist Willie Nelson. It was released in 1981 as a double-LP. It has sold 6 million copies worldwide. The album was reissued on CD in 2003 with the inclusion of three bonus tracks.

Track listing

Side A

Side B

Side C

Side D

2003 CD edition
 "Railroad Lady" – 2:38
 "Heartaches of a Fool" – 2:28
 "Blue Eyes Crying in the Rain" – 2:17
 "Whiskey River" – 3:40
 "Good Hearted Woman" – 2:57
 "Georgia on My Mind" – 4:19
 "All of Me" (bonus track) – 3:55
 "If You've Got the Money I've Got the Time" – 2:05
 "Look What Thoughts Will Do" – 2:40
 "Remember Me" (bonus track) – 2:52
 "Uncloudy Day" – 4:38
 "Mammas Don't Let Your Babies Grow Up to Be Cowboys" – 3:25
 "My Heroes Have Always Been Cowboys" – 3:02
 "Help Me Make It Through the Night" – 3:57
 "Angel Flying Too Close to the Ground" – 4:23
 "I'd Have to Be Crazy" – 3:24
 "Faded Love" – 3:48
 "On the Road Again" – 2:39
 "Midnight Rider" (bonus track) – 2:52
 "Heartbreak Hotel" – 3:00
 "If You Could Touch Her at All" – 3:27
 "'Til I Gain Control Again" – 5:59
 "Stay a Little Longer" – 3:24
Total Length = 77:49

Chart performance

References

1981 compilation albums
Willie Nelson compilation albums
Columbia Records compilation albums